Agnes Banks is a suburb of Sydney, in the state of New South Wales, Australia. Agnes Banks is 68 kilometres north-west of the Sydney central business district, in the local government areas of the City of Penrith and City of Hawkesbury. It is part of the Greater Western Sydney region.

Agnes Banks is connected to Penrith by Castlereagh Road which runs alongside the Nepean River between Richmond and Penrith. Natural woodlands and sandy deposits make up the higher landscape of this suburb. Agnes Banks is a rural outpost of the City of Penrith which has kept its intrinsic agricultural value and rural lifestyle.

History
This area was settled as early as 1803 by Charles Palmer. He was the first man to receive the free land grants in 1803; he and his wife Mary Anne built the first Farm Slab House the same year. The 3 chimneys still stand near the corner of Castlereagh Rd and Springwood Rd. The town here was once known as 'Little Richmond'. In 1804 Andrew Thompson was given a grant which he named Agnes Bank after his mother.

Heritage listings 
Agnes Banks has a number of heritage-listed sites, including:
 Rickards Avenue: Agnes Banks Natural Area

Weather record

Demographics
The other most common countries of birth were Malta 3.0%, England 2.8% and New Zealand 1.1%. 88.1% of residents spoke only English at home. Other languages spoken at home included Maltese 2.6%, Macedonian 1.4% and Greek 0.7%. The most common responses for religious affiliation were Catholic 35.8%, Anglican 19.7% and No Religion 17.7%.

References

External links
  [CC-By-SA]

Suburbs of Sydney